Odobești may refer to several places in Romania:

 Odobești, Vrancea County
 Odobești, Bacău, a commune in Bacău County
 Odobești, Dâmbovița, a commune in Dâmbovița County

and to:

 Odobești, a village in Valea-Trestieni Commune, Nisporeni district, Moldova